Prof Bernhard Studer HFRSE (August 21, 1794May 2, 1887), was a 19th-century Swiss geologist.

Biography

He was born at Buren an der Aare near Bern in Switzerland on 21 August 1794.

He was educated to become a clergyman, but his interests later switched to sciences. In 1815 he became a teacher of mathematics at the gymnasium in Bern, and during the following year, began studying geology at University of Göttingen as a pupil of Johann Friedrich Ludwig Hausmann. He subsequently furthered his education at Freiburg, Berlin and Paris.

In 1825 he published his first major work, Beyträge zu einer Monographie der Molasse. Later on, he commenced his detailed investigations of the western Alps, and published in 1834 his Geologie der westlichen Schweizer-Alpen. In the same year, largely through his influence, the University of Bern was established and he became the first professor of geology. His Geologie der Schweiz in two volumes (1851–1853), and his geological maps of Switzerland, prepared with the assistance of Arnold Escher von der Linth, are high points of his research. In 1850 he was elected a Foreign Member of the Geological Society of London.

In 1859 he organized the geological survey of Switzerland, being appointed president of the commission, and retaining this position until the end of his life. It was remarked by Jules Marcou that Studer was present at the first meeting of the Société helvétique des sciences naturelles at Geneva on October 6, 1815, and remained a member during 72 years. In 1864, he was elected as a member of the American Philosophical Society. He was awarded the Wollaston medal by the Geological Society of London, in 1879. In 1882, he was elected a Foreign Honorary Member of the American Academy of Arts and Sciences.

References

1794 births
1887 deaths
19th-century Swiss geologists
Tectonicists
Academic staff of the University of Bern
University of Göttingen alumni
Wollaston Medal winners
Fellows of the American Academy of Arts and Sciences
Recipients of the Pour le Mérite (civil class)
People from the canton of Bern
University of Bern alumni